"Fare Thee Well" (sometimes known as "The Turtle Dove") is an 18th-century English folk ballad, listed as number 422 in the Roud Folk Song Index. In the song, a lover bids farewell before setting off on a journey, and the lyrics include a dialogue between the lovers.

History
The first published version of the song appeared in Roxburghe Ballads dated 1710; the lyrics were there given the title "The True Lover's Farewell". The song was traditionally sung to a range of different tunes.

In 1907, the composer and folk-song scholar Ralph Vaughan Williams recorded David Penfold, an innkeeper from Rusper, Sussex, singing "Turtle Dove", and the recording is available online via the British Library Sound Archive.

Lyrical content
"Fare Thee Well" shares several lyrics which parallel those of Robert Burns's "A Red, Red Rose".  The lyrics are also strikingly similar to a folk song titled, "My Dear Mary Ann" that dates back to the mid-19th century. Similarities include the meter and rhyme scheme, as well as the alternative title of "Ten Thousand Miles". Lyrical similarities include the opening line, "Fare thee well my own true love", "Ten thousand miles or more" (word-for-word matches), and the question of seeing a dove or other bird crying for its love. The subjects of the songs are practically identical: Lovers mourning their separation and longing to return to one another.

Musical arrangements
In 1919, Vaughan Williams wrote an arrangement of the song, entitled "The Turtle Dove", for solo baritone (later re-arranged for solo and SATB choir). Tia Blake released a version of the song similar to Vaughan Williams' arrangement and the original phonograph recording on her album Folk Songs and Ballads: Tia Blake and Her Folk-group.

The song has been recorded by Nic Jones, Joan Baez on her 1960 debut album, Mary Black, Eliza Carthy, Chad & Jeremy, Mary Chapin Carpenter, Liam Clancy, Marianne Faithfull, Burl Ives, Molina and Roberts, Bonny Light Horseman and June Tabor.

Mary Chapin Carpenter's version was used in the movie Fly Away Home (1996).
The King's Singers performed and recorded an arrangement of The Turtle Dove by their baritone Philip Lawson (composer and arranger)

Lyrics

The following lyrics were adapted by Vaughan Williams from the phonograph recording of David Penfold.
Fare you well my dear, I must be gone
And leave you for a while
If I roam away I'll come back again
Though I roam ten thousand miles, my dear
Though I roam ten thousand miles

So fair though art my bonny lass
So deep in love am I
But I never will prove false to the bonny lass I love
Till the stars fall from the sky my dear
Till the stars fall from the sky

The sea will never run dry, my dear
Nor the rocks never melt with the sun
But I never will prove false to the bonny lass I love
Till all these things be done my dear
Till all these things be done

O yonder doth sit that little turtle dove
He doth sit on yonder high tree
A making a moan for the loss of his love
As I will do for thee my dear
As I will do for thee

References
References 1-6 are transcribed from the Traditional Ballad Index website listed in "External Links" below

External links
 The Mudcat Cafe: DTStudy: My Dear Mary Ann
 The Traditional Ballad Index: An Annotated Bibliography of the Folk Songs of the English-Speaking World hosted by California State University Fresno
 
 The Turtle Dove (Ralph Vaughan Williams) 1924 sheet music

Folk ballads
Joan Baez songs
Chad & Jeremy songs
English songs
18th-century songs
1710 songs